Ping Hai was a light cruiser in the Chinese fleet before World War II and the second ship of the . The ship was laid down in China to the specifications supplied by the Japanese, and Japanese advisors were hired to oversee the construction. Compared to its sister ship Ning Hai, it had a lower-output powerplant and lacked seaplane facilities. Its anti-aircraft armament was also different from that of its sister.

The progress of its construction was affected by the Mukden Incident (18 September 1931) and the January 28 Incident (28 January – 3 March 1932). Disruption of parts supply and non-cooperation of Japanese advisors delayed its launch date from the originally planned 10 October 1933 to 28 September 1935. Blocked delivery of originally-specified anti-aircraft weapons meant that equivalent replacements of those weapons had to be bought via Germany.  When it was completed in 1936, official outbreak of war was barely a year away.

Service record 
Ping Hai served as the flagship of the Republic of China Navy (ROCN) since April 1937.

As one of the most powerful surface combatants within the ROCN, Ping Hai was subjected to aerial attacks by the Imperial Japanese Navy since the Battle of Shanghai, but she was not until 23 September, during the Japanese assault on the Kiangyin Fortress (which guarded the segment of Yangtze River near Nanking), for Ping Hai to finally succumb with her sister ship to airstrikes launched from both the aircraft carrier  and airfields around occupied Shanghai.

She was then re-floated by the Japanese in 1938 as sunken ships would not be as badly corroded by river water as they would be by sea water. Originally the ship was to be transferred to the Collaborationist navy under Wang Jing-Wei, but the Japanese elected to seize her instead and had Ping Hai towed to Sasebo, outfitted first as a barracks hulk  and ultimately as the escort ship Yasoshima on 10 June 1944. She was re-rated first as a coastal defense ship and then as an escort vessel. The ship lost all cruiser armaments but received radar sets as well as standard Japanese dual-purpose and anti-aircraft weapons.

Yasoshima was deployed for combat operations on 25 September 1944, participating in the Battle of Leyte Gulf and escorting troop convoys. Aircraft from the carriers  and  caught her escorting two merchantmen west of Luzon and sank all three on 25 November 1944.

References

Bibliography

External links 

 http://www.globalsecurity.org/military/world/japan/exchina-cl.htm
 https://web.archive.org/web/20100510015014/http://big5.chinabroadcast.cn/gate/big5/gb.cri.cn/3821/2004/08/26/151@280506.htm
 http://www.history.navy.mil/photos/sh-fornv/japan/japsh-xz/yasoshma.htm
 

Ning Hai-class cruisers
Ships built in China
1931 ships
Second Sino-Japanese War cruisers of China
Cruisers sunk by aircraft
World War II cruisers of Japan
Captured ships
Maritime incidents in November 1944
Ships sunk by Japanese aircraft
Ships sunk by US aircraft
Shipwrecks of the Philippines
Shipwrecks in the South China Sea
Naval ships of the Republic of China captured by Japan during World War II